Grunauer is a surname. Notable people with the surname include:

Alexander Grunauer (1921–2013), Russian Soviet scientist
Peter Grunauer, Austrian chef

See also
Grünauer BC, a German football club